Terry Alfriend is an American engineer, currently the University Distinguished Professor and TEES Distinguished Research Professor at Texas A&M University and an Elected Fellow of the American Institute of Aeronautics and Astronautics, National Academy of Engineering, International Academy of Astronautics, American Astronomical Society and Editor-in-Chief of AAS-Springer journal Journal of the Astronautical Sciences.

Educational Background
Ph.D., Engineering Mechanics, Virginia Tech -1967
M.S., Engineering Mechanics, Stanford University - 1964
B.S., Engineering Mechanics, Virginia Tech - 1962

References

Year of birth missing (living people)
Living people
Texas A&M University faculty
21st-century American engineers
Stanford University School of Engineering alumni
Virginia Tech alumni
Academic journal editors